Logoisk crater is a meteorite impact crater in Belarus near the city of Lahojsk.

The crater is not exposed at the surface.

References

Further reading 
 Glazovskaya, L. I., Impact transformation of the crystalline basement in the Logoisk astrobleme, Meteorite Impacts in Precambrian Shields. Programme and Abstracts, the 4th Workshop of the European Science Foundation IMpact Programme, Lappajarvi-Karikkoselka-Saaksjarvi, Finland, May 24–28, 2000. ed. J. Plado and L.J. Pesonen. 2000
 Masaitis V. L. et al., The Logoysk Astrobleme, 1984

External links 
 Information about meteorite impact craters, Logoisk crater

Impact craters of Belarus
Eocene impact craters
Lutetian Stage